The Center for the Book was founded in 1977 by Daniel J. Boorstin, the Librarian of Congress, to promote literacy, libraries, and reading and an understanding of the history and heritage of American literature. The Center for the Book is mainly supported by tax-deductible donations. In 1984, the center began creating affiliated State Centers for the Book. Today, the Center for the Book has an affiliate center in all 50 states, the District of Columbia, and in the U.S. Virgin Islands.

History
In 1977, Librarian of Congress Dr. Daniel J. Boorstin founded the Library of Congress' Center for the Book, which was established by Congress in public law 95-129 to promote books, reading, literacy and libraries, as well as the scholarly study of books. Dr. Boorstin appointed Dr. John Y. Cole to the position of founding director of the Center for the Book. Cole had previously served as the chairman of the one-year task force on library goals, organization and planning that had recommended a Center for the Book to Dr. Boorstin. In 1984 the center began to establish state affiliate Centers for the Book. Today there are affiliate centers in all 50 states, the District of Columbia and the U.S. Virgin Islands.

Leadership
Dr. John Y. Cole was the founding director of the Center for the Book; he served in that position from 1977 until 2016. He is the author of Jefferson’s Legacy: A Brief History of the Library of Congress (1993) and On These Walls: Inscriptions and Quotations in the Library of Congress (1995), among other books focusing on the history of the Library of Congress, where he is the institution's official historian.

In June 2016 Pam Jackson was named the director of the Center for the Book. As of 2018, the director is John Van Oudenaren.

Affiliated projects

National Book Festival 

The Library of Congress National Book Festival, established in 2001, is an annual event in which the Center for the Book plays a major role. The festival was previously held on the National Mall for two days in the fall. Authors are invited to give readings, sign books, give lectures and do interviews. Representatives from across the country are also invited to promote their states’ literary heritage in the Pavilion of the States. Tens of thousands of people attend the festival each year. In 2014, the National Book Festival will move indoors to the Walter E. Washington Convention Center. Other changes include returning to a one-day schedule. Evening hours will be added so about the same number of authors will participate.

Letters About Literature 

Letters About Literature was a national contest created by the Center for the Book that encouraged literacy in grades 4–12. The contest asked students to read a work of either prose or poetry and write to its author (living or dead), explaining how what they read affected them. Contestants competed in one of three age groups: Level I: grades 4–6; Level II: grades 7–8; Level III: grades 9–12. Letters were initially screened through two rounds of judges, who were individuals with knowledge of children’s literature. The best letters moved on to state competitions, and those winners moved on to a national competition hosted by the Library of Congress. Judging began in March for state competitions, and national winners were announced in May. The final competition was held during the 2018/19 school year.

River of Words 

The Center for the Book and St. Mary's College Center for Environmental Literacy partner in presenting River of Words, the largest youth poetry and art competition in the world. Founded in 1995 under former Poet Laureate Robert Hass, the contest is free to all contestants. The contest asks students ages 5–19 to examine a watershed in their environment and reflect on what it means to them. They must then express their reflection through poetry or art. In 2011 the Center for the Book co-sponsored a concert in which acclaimed composer Libby Larsen set some of the winning poems to music. Every year the contest receives tens of thousands of submissions. The contest is particularly popular with Scout troops and other organizations with an emphasis on the outdoors.

Young Readers Center 
The Young Readers Center was opened in the Library of Congress' Thomas Jefferson Building in 2009 to provide a place for children 16 years and younger accompanied by an adult to access reading materials and other literary resources and to attend programs, such as a weekly story hour.

Literacy Awards 
The Center for the Book began managing the Library of Congress Literacy Awards after their creation was announced at the 2012 International Summit for the Book. Created and sponsored by philanthropist David M. Rubenstein, the awards support organizations that perform innovative work in increasing literacy levels. Totaling $250,000, the three annual awards are given to organizations that have made significant progress in advancing the promotion of literacy in the United States and beyond: the David M. Rubenstein Prize ($150,000), the American Prize ($50,000), and the International Prize ($50,000).

The award winners and honorees are announced at the annual Library of Congress National Book Festival, and list is available at the Library of Congress website.

National Collegiate Book Collecting Contest 
The National Collegiate Book Collecting Contest was started in 2005 by Fine Books & Collections magazine to recognize extraordinary book collections of college students. After three years of running the competition, the magazine turned it over to the Library of Congress. More than 35 colleges and universities hold book-collecting contests. The winners of those contests are encouraged to enter the national competition. Student book collectors whose schools do not offer a competition may also apply to the national contest.

Library of Congress Poetry & Literature Center 
The Center for the Book administers the Library of Congress Poetry & Literature Center, which serves as the Office of the U.S. Poet Laureate. The Poetry & Literature Center organizes a yearly program of readings, performances, conferences and lectures. The center oversees the prestigious biannual Rebekah Johnson Bobbitt National Prize for Poetry. The prize is awarded to the most distinguished American book of poetry published in the two years before the award is given. The center also grants the esteemed Witter Bynner Fellowship. Started in 1998, the Poetry & Literature Center awards these fellowships to two up-and-coming poets.

National Ambassador for Young People’s Literature 

Sponsored by the Center for the Book and the Children’s Book Council, the National Ambassador for Young People’s Literature serves to promote youth literacy and the valuable attributes it develops, such as lifelong literacy, education and the growth and enhancement of the lives of young people. The ambassador is appointed by a select group of individuals who work in the youth literature field. Four individuals have held the positions since its creation in 2008: Jon Scieszka, Katherine Paterson, Walter Dean Myers, Kate DiCamillo, and current ambassador Gene Luen Yang.

See also
 Books in the United States

References

External links
 Center for the Book homepage

 
Library of Congress